Edmonton is a hamlet west of Wadebridge in Cornwall, England. It is in the civil parish of St Breock.

References

Hamlets in Cornwall